Charles Billy (born June 23, 1962) is an American singer who is best known as the lead vocalist for thrash metal band Testament.

Career

Testament
Billy joined Legacy in 1986, replacing vocalist Steve "Zetro" Souza who would later join Exodus. After Legacy changed its name to Testament, the band released their debut album The Legacy in 1987, which featured one song written by Billy entitled "Do or Die". Testament has since released twelve more studio albums, and toured consistently, including sharing the stage with notable acts such as Iron Maiden, Judas Priest, Black Sabbath, Devin Townsend, Kiss, Megadeth, Slayer, Anthrax, Exodus, Overkill, Sepultura, Suicidal Tendencies, Pantera, White Zombie, Primus, D.R.I. and Pro-Pain.

Although Testament's lineup has changed over the years, Billy is one of the two constant members of the band along with guitarist and founder Eric Peterson; they are the only two members of Testament to appear on all of the band's studio albums. His vocal style has changed considerably over the years from a clear, high-pitched thrash style to a lower register approaching a death grunt. Since the Low album, he has mixed both styles, sometimes within the same song.

Work outside of Testament

Billy's influences reportedly include Rob Halford, Ronnie James Dio, Bruce Dickinson, Phil Mogg, James Hetfield, Ozzy Osbourne, Geddy Lee, Bon Scott, Steven Tyler, Alice Cooper, Robert Plant, Phil Lynott and Klaus Meine.

Prior to Legacy and Testament, Billy was the vocalist for a local metal band called Guilt which also featured future Hericane Alice and Medicine Wheel guitarist Danny Gill. No records by the band exist but they recorded one demo in 1984 and contributed the song "Down to the City" to the U.S. Metal Vol. IV compilation on Shrapnel Records. He also played in high school bands.

Around 1996, Billy auditioned for lead vocals with Sepultura as the replacement for Max Cavalera, but lost that position to Derrick Green.

Billy has also appeared on the solo projects of James Murphy, playing on both albums as a guest musician.

In 2006, Billy provided vocals on the Sadus song "Crazy" and, along with several other musicians from other bands, did a cover of Iron Maiden's "Fear of the Dark" for their Numbers from the Beast tribute album. On Light This City's 2008 release, Stormchaser, he provides vocals on the song "Firehaven."

He also joined with musicians including his brothers Eddie and Andy Billy, Steve Souza, Greg Bustamante, Steve Robello, Dan Cunningham, Willy Lange to form the band Dublin Death Patrol.

In 2008, Billy did the vocals for Silent Night on the album of Christmas carols We Wish You a Metal Xmas and a Headbanging New Year with the likes of Scott Ian, Jon Donais, Chris Wyse and John Tempesta.

In 2009, Billy appeared on the song "Live My Dream" from the band Susperia's album, Attitude.

For the live presentation of the album Ziltoid the Omniscient by Devin Townsend, he provided the voice of the Planet Smasher on the track of the same name. This happened at Tuska Open Air Metal Festival 2010 in Helsinki.

In 2014, Billy provided guest vocals on the song "Trend Killer" on Swedish melodeath band The Haunted's album Exit Wounds.

In 2014, Billy appeared on fellow thrash metal band Exodus' latest album Blood In, Blood Out and provided guest vocals on the track "BTK." He had previously filled in Zetro on vocals for Exodus' performance on October 28, 2004, at the Warfield Theatre in San Francisco, where the band opened for Megadeth.

In 2015, Billy appeared on Metal Allegiance's self-titled album and provided featured vocals on the track "Can't Kill the Devil."

Billy and Jake Oni contributed vocals to the song "The Never" from Lamb of God guitarist Mark Morton's debut solo album Anesthetic, released in March 2019.

In 2019, Billy appeared as a featured artist on the Killswitch Engage song "The Crownless King" from their album Atonement.

In 2020, Billy appeared on the Lamb of God song "Routes" from their self-titled album.

In 2021, Billy provided additional voices for the Disney+ television series "What If...?", part of the Marvel Cinematic Universe.

In 2022, Billy appeared on the Matt Heafy song "Behold Our Power"

In 2022, Billy appeared on deathcore band Shadow of Intent's new album Elegy released on January 14.

Possible solo album
In an August 2021 interview on The Jasta Show, Billy revealed that he might release a solo album in the future and hinted that its musical direction would be different from the traditional thrash metal style of Testament.

Awards and honors
In 2013, California State Assemblyman Jim Frazier honored Billy on the State Assembly floor for his positive influence on the Native American community.

Billy became the first Native American to be permanently featured in the memorabilia display at the Hard Rock Hotel in Albuquerque, New Mexico, in 2013. He is also recognized in the National Museum of the American Indian exhibit in the Smithsonian Institution titled "Up Where We Belong: Native Musicians in Popular Culture", which was on display through January 2, 2011.

Personal life
Billy was born to a Native American father and a Mexican mother. He is of the Pomo Native Americans, an indigenous people of Northern California, and is proud of his Native American heritage, sometimes giving a shoutout to his "Native brothers and sisters" in the audience. The song "Trail of Tears" is a tribute to his heritage, as are "Allegiance" and "Native Blood". Billy is first cousins with Stephen Carpenter, co-founder and lead guitarist of alternative metal band Deftones.

In 2001, Billy was diagnosed with germ cell seminoma; his was a rare medical situation since this type of cancer usually manifests in men's testicular region, while in Billy's case the tumor appeared in the chest region near his heart. In August 2001, friends organized the Thrash of the Titans benefit concert, held to raise money for Billy's medical expenses. Following chemotherapy, he has since been given a clean bill of health and continued to work with Testament.

In March 2020, Billy and his wife Tiffany tested positive for COVID-19 following the completion of The Bay Strikes Back tour in Europe; he was the third person to have returned home sick from the aforementioned tour, following Will Carroll of Death Angel and Gary Holt of Exodus. Testament confirmed the testings in a statement and had been quarantined in his home since then.

References

External links 

 National Museum of the American Indian’s Newest Exhibition “Up Where We Belong: Native Musicians in Popular Culture”

	

1962 births
Living people
American heavy metal singers
20th-century American singers
20th-century American male singers
21st-century American singers
21st-century American male singers
American baritones
American musicians of Mexican descent
Hispanic and Latino American musicians
Native American singers
People from Antioch, California
Pomo people
Testament (band) members
Singers from California